The 2015 Qatar Cup, more widely known as the Crown Prince Cup, was the twenty-first edition of the Qatar Cup. It was played from April 26–May 1. The cup is contested by the top four finishers of the 2014–15 Qatar Stars League.

Participants

Matches

Semi-finals

Finals

Bracket

Top scorers

References

Qatar Crown Prince Cup
Qatar Cup
Qatar Cup